is a Japanese sport shooter who competed in the 1964 Summer Olympics.

References

1937 births
Living people
Japanese male sport shooters
ISSF pistol shooters
Olympic shooters of Japan
Shooters at the 1964 Summer Olympics
Shooters at the 1970 Asian Games
Shooters at the 1974 Asian Games
Asian Games medalists in shooting
Asian Games gold medalists for Japan
Asian Games silver medalists for Japan
Medalists at the 1970 Asian Games
Medalists at the 1974 Asian Games
20th-century Japanese people